Corniglio is a comune (municipality) in the Province of Parma in the Italian region Emilia-Romagna, located about  west of Bologna and about  southwest of Parma. 

Corniglio borders the following municipalities: Bagnone, Berceto, Calestano, Filattiera, Langhirano, Monchio delle Corti, Palanzano, Pontremoli, Tizzano Val Parma.

It is home to a castle, known since 1240. It was built in sandstone by the Rossi family, who held it until the 16th century.

References

External links
 Official website

Cities and towns in Emilia-Romagna
Castles in Italy